Katja Mira Herbers (born 19 October 1980) is a Dutch actress. She is best known for portraying Dr. Helen Prins on the WGN America drama series Manhattan (2014–2015), Emily Grace in the HBO science fiction drama series Westworld (2018–2020), and Dr. Kristen Bouchard in the CBS/Paramount+ supernatural drama series Evil (2019–present).

Herbers also played recurring roles in the FX spy thriller series The Americans (2015), the HBO mystery drama series The Leftovers (2017), and the Discovery Channel drama series Manhunt: Unabomber (2017).

Early life and education
Katja Mira Herbers was born on 19 October 1980, and is the daughter of violinist Vera Beths and oboist and conductor Werner Herbers. Growing up she spent time in the US, accompanying her mother on tour with the group L'Archibudelli. Her mother remarried to cellist Anner Bylsma, and her father remarried to costume designer Leonie Polak, who introduced her to the theater. She had a Canadian au pair and learned to speak Dutch, German, and English growing up.

Herbers went to the Ignatius Gymnasium in Amsterdam. She studied psychology at the University of Amsterdam (1999–2000), during which time she also attended the local theatre school De Trap. She moved to New York and attended HB Studio. She then got accepted to the Academy of Theatre and Dance, which was previously named de Theater school, in Amsterdam (2001–2005).

Career
During her studies, she starred in the films Peter Bell (2002) and Brush with Fate (2003). After her graduation, Herbers became a member of Johan Simons's Theater Company NTGent in Ghent. She then joined the renowned Munich Kammerspiele in Germany. She worked with directors such as Alex van Warmerdam, Ivo van Hove and Theu Boermans under whose direction she performed many Schnitzler plays, including his monologue Fräulein Else, for which she received rave reviews. In 2013, she won the Guido de Moor Award for young talent, for her portrayal of Irina in Chekhov's Three Sisters. She played a lead role in The Boermans' De Uitverkorene (2006), which won an International Emmy and the prestigious Prix D'Europe.

She performed the piece Im wunderschönen Monat Mai, 21 songs after Schubert and Schumann, with pianist, conductor and composer Reinbert de Leeuw in 2013.

In February 2014, she won the role of physicist Helen Prins in WGN America's drama series Manhattan. Herbers played a recurring role in the third season of FX's The Americans.

In 2018, she joined the cast of the HBO science fiction drama series Westworld, starring as Emily Grace.

In fall 2019, Herbers began starring as Dr. Kristen Bouchard in the CBS supernatural drama series Evil.

Herbers divides her time between New York, Los Angeles, and Amsterdam.

Filmography

Film

Television

Theatre
 2013 – Im wunderschönen Monat Mai (Schubert, Schumann, Reinbert de Leeuw)
 2013 – An Ideal Husband (Oscar Wilde, Theu Boermans, Nationale Toneel)
 2013 – Platform (Houellebecq, Stephan Kimmig, Münchner Kammerspiele)
 2012 – The Mother (Gorky, Alvis Hermanis, Münchner Kammerspiele)
 2012 – Three Sisters (Chekhov, Theu Boermans, Nationale Toneel)
 2011 – Winterreise (Schubert, Elfriede Jellinek, Johan Simons, Münchner Kammerspiele)
 2010/2011 – Hotel Savoy (Joseph Roth, Johan Simons, Münchner Kammerspiele)
 2010 – Fraulein Else (Schitzler, Theu Boermans, De Theatercompagnie)
 2008/2009 – The Lonely Road (Schnitzler, Theu Boermans, De Theatercompagnie)
 2007 – The Vast Domain (Schnitler, Theu Boermans, De Theatercompagnie)
 2007/2008 and 2009 – Double Indemnity (Billy Wilder, Johan Simons, NTGent)
 2006 – Life Is a Dream (Calderon, Johans Simons, NTGent)
 2006 – Opening Night (Cassavetes, Ivo van Hove), NTGent/Toneelgroep Amsterdam/)
 2006 – Edward II (Marlowe, Johan Simons, NTGent)
 2004/2005 – The Terrible Mother (Alex van Warmerdam, De Mexicaanse hond)

References

External links

 

1980 births
Dutch film actresses
Dutch stage actresses
Dutch television actresses
Living people
Actresses from Amsterdam
21st-century Dutch actresses
 Dutch expatriates in the United States